National Galleries of Scotland is the executive non-departmental public body that controls the three national galleries of Scotland and two partner galleries, forming one of the National Collections of Scotland.

The purpose of the National Galleries of Scotland (NGS) was set out by an Act of Parliament in the National Galleries of Scotland Act 1906, amended by the National Heritage (Scotland) Act 1985. Its role is to manage the National Galleries of Scotland, care for, preserve and add to the objects in its collections, exhibit artworks to the public and to promote education and public enjoyment and understanding of the Fine Arts. It is governed by a Board of Trustees who are appointed by ministers of the Scottish Government.

History
The National Gallery of Scotland (now called the Scottish National Gallery) was opened to the public in 1859. Located on The Mound in the centre of Scotland's capital city, Edinburgh, the building was originally shared between the National Gallery and the collection of the Royal Scottish Academy (RSA). The gallery was a success, and in response to increasing public demand for the celebration of Scottish history and culture, the Scottish National Portrait Gallery (SNPG) was opened in 1889 to display portraits of noted Scots. The National Gallery collection was nevertheless constrained by lack of space in the premises on The Mound, and in 1906 the National Galleries of Scotland Act granted to the RSA perpetual tenancy of the Royal Institution building in front of the National Gallery, allowing the National Galleries collection to take over the entire National Gallery of Scotland building. Since then, the Royal Institution building became known as the Royal Scottish Academy.

In 1959, National Galleries of Scotland expanded further with the establishment of the Scottish National Gallery of Modern Art (SNGMA), housed in Inverleith House in the Royal Botanic Garden Edinburgh. Twentieth-century artworks in the National Galleries collection were relocated to the new gallery, and the gallery began to acquire many more objects after 1960. By 1984, the modern art gallery had outgrown its first home, and the SNGMA relocated to the vacant John Watson's Institution building, a former school. In 1999, the SNGMA expanded with the opening of 
The Dean Gallery (now called Modern Two) in a former orphanage opposite the Gallery of Modern Art.

In 2012, National Galleries of Scotland underwent a rebranding exercise, and the National Gallery of Scotland building on The Mound was renamed the Scottish National Gallery to distinguish it from the organisation that manages it.

Copyright 

The NGS website's "Copyright & Image Licensing" page claims that "Images of works where copyright has expired ... are available for you to use under the terms of the CC-BY-NC 3.0 License", while the individual download pages of such images assert: "You may copy, print, display, and store this image for your personal, non-commercial use." and "The image must be attributed with the artist, title of the artwork, copyright holder, and 'National Galleries of Scotland'. The image must also be linked back to this artwork page on the National Galleries of Scotland website... if you require a commercial license please fill in an online application."

List of national galleries 
 The Scottish National Gallery
 The Scottish National Portrait Gallery
 The Scottish National Gallery of Modern Art

The Partner Galleries are:
 Duff House in Banff, Aberdeenshire
 Paxton House, Berwickshire

See also
Board of Manufactures
The Playfair Project
 Scottish Publishers Association

References

External links
Official website
National Galleries of Scotland within Google Arts & Culture

 
Art museums and galleries in Edinburgh
Scottish Government Learning and Justice Directorate
Book publishing companies of Scotland
Charities based in Edinburgh